Julien Jalâl Eddine Weiss (October 18, 1953—January 2, 2015) was a French musician, composer and the founder of Al-Kindi Ensemble, a Sufi musical group based in Aleppo, Syria.

Biography
Born on October 18, 1953 in Paris to a Swiss-German mother and an Alsatian father, Julien Weiss, a guitarist of classical training which he learned from École Normale de Musique de Paris as a student, had fallen in love with Arabic music in 1976 when he met Munir Bachir, the Iraqi grand master of the oud (oriental lute). He then embarked on the study of this instrument and of the refined laws governing oriental micro-tonal music. Abandoning the oud for the qanûn, a sort of oriental zither which he had learned from great masters in various countries of the Middle East, Julien Weiss had founded in 1983 the instrumental ensemble Al-Kindi conceived as a takht (grouping of soloists) devoted to music of the Arab world. Three years later, in 1986, he converted to Islam and took the name Julien Jalâl Eddine Weiss as a homage to Jalāl ad-Dīn Muhammad Rūmī. During his career, Weiss performed at more than five hundred concerts, notably at the Théâtre de la Ville de Paris, the Institut du monde arabe in Paris, the Beiteddine Festival in Lebanon, Carnegie Hall in New York, and at Nuits de Fourvière in Lyon, as well as in cities such as Hong Kong, São Paulo, and Washington. In 2001, he was made an Officier of the Order of Arts and Letters  by the French Republic. Weiss died of cancer on January 2, 2015 in Paris at the age of 61. He is buried in the Père Lachaise Cemetery in Paris, France.

Tributes
French novelist Mathias Énard cited his death in his novel Boussole (translated into English as Compass).

Gallery

References

French musicians
Musicians from Paris
1953 births
2015 deaths
École Normale de Musique de Paris alumni
Recipients of the Ordre des Arts et des Lettres